Fissurella formosa is a species of sea snail, a marine gastropod mollusk in the family Fissurellidae, the keyhole limpets. The species original name was Fissurella formosa F. Salvat.

Description

Shell size varies between 11–21 mm.

Distribution 

Fissurella formosa is chiefly distributed around West Africa, especially in the region of Cape Verde.

References

Fissurellidae
Gastropods described in 1967